Phasis pringlei, the Pringle's arrowhead, is a species of butterfly in the family Lycaenidae. It is endemic to South Africa, where it is found in the Roggeveld escarpment of Northern Cape.

The wingspan is 32–38 mm for males and 36–43 mm females. Adults are on wing from September to December with a peak in November. There is one generation per year.

References

Phasis (butterfly)
Insects of South Africa
Butterflies described in 1977
Butterflies of Africa
Taxonomy articles created by Polbot